The 2021 CAF Confederation Cup Final was the final match of the 2020–21 CAF Confederation Cup, the 18th season of Africa's premier club football tournament organised by CAF under the CAF Confederation Cup title after the merger of CAF Cup and African Cup Winners' Cup. It was played at the Stade de l'Amitié in Cotonou, Benin on 10 July 2021.

Raja CA defeated JS Kabylie 2–1 to secure their second ever CAF Confederation Cup title. They also earned the right to play against Al Ahly S.C the CAF Champions league winner in the 2021–22 CAF Super Cup.

Teams

Venue

For the second consecutive year, the final was played as a single match at a pre-selected venue by CAF instead of a two-legged fixtures format, which was being used in the competition since 1966.

On 16 May 2021, Stade de l'Amitié in Cotonou, Benin was chosen by a CAF Executive Committee to host the final during a meeting in Kigali, Rwanda.

Road to the final

Note: In all results below, the score of the finalist is given first (H: home; A: away).

Format
The final was played as a single match at a pre-selected venue, with the winner of semi-final 1 according to the knockout stage draw designated as the "home" team for administrative purposes. If scores were level after full time, extra time would not to be played and the winner would be decided by a penalty shoot-out (Regulations Article III. 28).

Officials

Match

See also
2021 CAF Champions League Final
2021–22 CAF Super Cup

Notes

References

External links
CAFonline.com

2021
Final
July 2021 sports events in Africa
International club association football competitions hosted by Benin
Raja CA matches
JS Kabylie matches